Boeckmann or Böckmann is a German surname. Notable people with the surname include:

Alan L. Boeckmann, American businessman
Carl L. Boeckmann (1867–1923), Norwegian-American artist
Christine Böckmann (born 1955), German mathematician
Dee Boeckmann (1906–1989), American middle-distance runner
Eduard Boeckmann (1849–1927), Norwegian American ophthalmologist, physician and inventor
Gerd Böckmann (born 1944), German actor
Herbert von Boeckmann (1886–1974), German general during World War II 
Marcus Olaus Bockman (1849-1942), Norwegian-American Lutheran theologian
Udo Böckmann (born 1952), German footballer
Rudolf Boeckmann (1895–1944), German military officer
Vernon R. Boeckmann (1927-2016),American politician
Wilhelm Böckmann (1832–1902), German architect

See also
Herbert von Böckmann (1886–1974), German general

German-language surnames